Ebeling is a family name of German origin. It may refer to one of the following persons.

Carl Ebeling, American computer scientist
Carl Lodewijk Ebeling (1924–2017), Dutch linguist
Christoph Daniel Ebeling (1741–1817), German geography and history scholar
Claudia Müller-Ebeling (born 1956), German anthropologist and art historian
Elisabeth Ebeling (1946–2020), German film and stage actress
Hans Ebeling (1905–1980), Australian cricketer and cricket administrator.
Heinz Ebeling (1918–1987), German Luftwaffe Staffelkapitän and flying ace during World War II
Jan Ebeling (born 1958), American equestrian
Johann Georg Ebeling (1637–1676), German composer
Karola Ebeling, German actress
Klaus-Peter Ebeling (born 1944), German sprint canoeist
Mathilda Ebeling (1826–1851), Swedish soprano
Mick Ebeling (born 1970), American executive producer
Richard Ebeling (born 1950), American libertarian author
Werner Ebeling (1913–2008), German military officer

Surnames